Horrors of War may refer to:

 Horrors of War: Historical Reality and Philosophy, a 1989 Croatian book by Franjo Tuđman
 Horrors of War (film), a 2006 Nazi Zombie film